Alexander Robertson  was a Scottish footballer, whose regular position was as a half-back. He played for Hibernian, Manchester United, and Fair City Athletic. Robertson won the 1902 Scottish Cup and the 1903 Scottish league championship with Hibs, and was transferred to Manchester United at the end of the 1902–03 season.

References

External links
Alex Robertson, www.ihibs.co.uk
MUFCInfo.com profile

Association football midfielders
Hibernian F.C. players
Manchester United F.C. players
Footballers from Perth, Scotland
Scottish Football League players
Scottish footballers
English Football League players
Year of birth unknown
Year of death unknown